Vidal is a Catalan, Aragonese, and possibly also Romansh surname, which also appears in French, Italian, Portuguese and English, and as a given name.

Vidal may refer to:

Surname
Maurice Vidal Portman (1850–1935), a British doctor 
Aleix Vidal (born 1989), Spanish footballer
Alejo Vidal-Quadras Roca (born 1945), Spanish politician
Alexander Thomas Emeric Vidal (1792–1863), British admiral and surveyor
Alexander Vidal (1819–1906), Canadian politician
André Vidal (1908–1984), French engineer and politician
Arturo Vidal (born 1987), Chilean footballer
Ava Vidal (born 1976), British comedian
Bill Vidal (born 1951), American politician and civil servant
Borja Vidal (born 1981), Qatari handball player
Carmen Vidal (1915–2003), Spanish businesswoman
Cheche Vidal (born 1959), Venezuelan footballer
Christina Vidal (born 1981), American actress
Clément Vidal (born 2000), French footballer
Corey Vidal (born 1986), Canadian dancer and video maker
Daniel Heredia Vidal (born 1993), Spanish singer
David Vidal (born 1950), Spanish football manager
Dominique Vidal (born 1964), French businessman
Don José Vidal (1763–1823), Spanish colonial administrator
Doriane Vidal (born 1976), French snowboarder
Eileen Vidal, (died 2003), kelper telephone and radio operator
Elena Maria Vidal (born 1962), American writer
Emeric Essex Vidal (1791–1861), English watercolourist
Eugene Luther Vidal (1895–1969), American athlete and aviation pioneer
Francisco Vidal (1837–1907), Chilean navy officer and hydrographer
Francisco Vidal Salinas (born 1953), Chilean politician
François Vidal (1832–1911), French Provençal poet
Frédérique Vidal (born 1964), Monegasque biochemist and academic administrator
George William Vidal (1845–1907), British civil servant in India
Gilles Vidal (born 1972), French car designer
Gore Vidal (1925–2012), American writer
Gustave Prosper Vidal (1835–1905), French botanist
Héctor Manuel Vidal (1943–2014), Uruguayan theater director
Héctor Vidal Martínez (born 1967), Paraguayan footballer
Henri Vidal (1919–1959), French actor
Hernane Vidal de Souza (born 1986), Brazilian footballer
Janice Vidal (born 1982), Hong Kong singer
Javan Vidal (born 1989), British footballer
Jean Baptiste Emile Vidal (1825–1893), French dermatologist
Jean-Pierre Vidal (born 1977), French alpine skier
Jill Vidal (born 1982), Hong Kong singer
José Vidal (baseball) (1940–2011), Dominican baseball player
José Vidal (Uruguayan footballer) (1896–1974), Uruguayan footballer
José María Vidal (1935–1986), Spanish footballer
Josefina Vidal (born 1961), Cuban diplomat
Joseph Vidal (1933–2020), French politician
Josette Vidal (born 1991), Venezuelan actress
Juan Carlos Vidal (born 1954), Spanish footballer
Laurent Vidal (born 1984), French triathlete
Leona Vidal Roberts (born 1972), Falkland Islands politician. 
Leoncio Vidal (1864–1896), Cuban revolutionary
Lisa Vidal (born 1965), American actress
Lucas Vidal (born 1984), Spanish composer
Lluïsa Vidal (1876–1918), Spanish painter
Maïa Vidal (born 1988), American musician
Maria Vidal (born 1956), American singer
María-Esther Vidal, Venezuelan scientist
María Eugenia Vidal (born 1973), Argentine politician
Marquinhos Carioca (born 1992), Brazilian footballer
Mary Theresa Vidal (1815–1873), Australian writer 
Mey Vidal (born 1984), Cuban musician
Nacho Vidal (born 1973), Spanish porn actor and producer
Owen Vidal (1819–1854), Anglican Bishop of Sierra Leone
Paul Vidal (1863–1931), French musician
Paul Vidal de la Blache (1845–1918), French geographer
Rafael Vidal (1964–2005), Venezuelan swimmer and sports commentator
René Vidal (politician) (1931–2012), Bolivian politician
René Vidal (born 1974), Chilean computer scientist
Ricardo Vidal (1931–2017), Filipino cardinal-priest and archbishop
Walpole Vidal (1853–1914), English footballer
Silvino Vidal (1850–1937), Portuguese writer
Tanya Vidal (born 1965), American actress and director
Vanessa Lima Vidal (born 1984), Brazilian model, beach volleyball player and beauty pageant contestant
Vanessa Vidal (born 1974), French alpine skier
Vincent Vidal (1811–1887), French painter

Given name
Vidal of Tolosa, Spanish rabbi in 14th century
Vidal Benveniste, Spanish rabbi in 15th century
Vidal Cantu (born 1968), Mexican film producer 
Vidal Fernandez (born 1958), American soccer player
Vidal Francisco Soberón Sanz (born 1958), Mexican admiral
Vidal Hazelton (born 1988), American football player
Vidal López (1918–1971), Venezuelan baseball player and manager
Vidal Marín del Campo (1653–1709), Spanish bishop and Grand Inquisitor of Spain
Vidal Medina (born 1976), Mexican playwright and theatre director
Vidal Nuño (born 1987), American baseball player
Vidal Sanabria (born 1966), Paraguayan football player
Vidal Sancho (born 1977), Spanish actor
Vidal Santiago Díaz (1910–1982), Puerto Rican politician
Vidal Sassoon (1928–2012), British hairdresser and businessman
Vidal Vega (1964–2012), Paraguayan politician

See also
Vidal (disambiguation)
Georges-Fernand Widal
Vitale

References

External links
http://genforum.genealogy.com/vidal/messages/143.html
http://www.portuguesaebrasileira.com/genealogia.html
http://www.heraldicapellido.com/v6/Vidal.htm

Catalan-language surnames
Occitan-language surnames
Spanish-language surnames
French-language surnames
Portuguese-language surnames